

Events

Pre-1600
 714 – Pepin of Herstal, mayor of the Merovingian palace, dies at Jupille (modern Belgium). He is succeeded by his infant grandson Theudoald, while his widow Plectrude holds actual power in the Frankish Kingdom.
 755 – An Lushan revolts against Chancellor Yang Guozhong at Yanjing, initiating the An Lushan Rebellion during the Tang dynasty of China.
1431 – Hundred Years' War: Henry VI of England is crowned King of France at Notre Dame in Paris.
1497 – Vasco da Gama passes the Great Fish River at the southern tip of Africa, where Bartolomeu Dias had previously turned back to Portugal.
1575 – An earthquake with an estimated magnitude of 8.5 strikes Valdivia, Chile.
1598 – Seven-Year War: Battle of Noryang: The final battle of the Seven-Year War is fought between the China and the Korean allied forces and Japanese navies, resulting in a decisive allied forces victory.

1601–1900
1653 – English Interregnum: The Protectorate: Oliver Cromwell becomes Lord Protector of the Commonwealth of England, Scotland and Ireland.
1689 – Convention Parliament: The Declaration of Right is embodied in the Bill of Rights.
1761 – Seven Years' War: After a four-month siege, the Russians under Pyotr Rumyantsev take the Prussian fortress of Kołobrzeg.
1773 – American Revolution: Boston Tea Party: Members of the Sons of Liberty disguised as Mohawk Indians dump hundreds of crates of tea into Boston harbor as a protest against the Tea Act.
1777 – Virginia becomes the first state to ratify the Articles of Confederation. 
1782 – British East India Company: Muharram Rebellion: Hada and Mada Miah lead the first anti-British uprising in the subcontinent against Robert Lindsay and his contingents in Sylhet Shahi Eidgah.
1811 – The first two in a series of four severe earthquakes occur in the vicinity of New Madrid, Missouri.
1826 – Benjamin W. Edwards rides into Mexican-controlled Nacogdoches, Texas, and declares himself ruler of the Republic of Fredonia.
1838 – Great Trek: Battle of Blood River: Voortrekkers led by Andries Pretorius and Sarel Cilliers defeat Zulu impis, led by Dambuza (Nzobo) and Ndlela kaSompisi in what is today KwaZulu-Natal, South Africa.
1843 – The discovery of octonions by John T. Graves, who denoted them with a boldface O, was announced to his mathematician friend William Hamilton, discoverer of quaternions, in a letter on this date.
1850 – The Charlotte Jane and the Randolph bring the first of the Canterbury Pilgrims to Lyttelton, New Zealand.
1863 – American Civil War: Joseph E. Johnston replaces Braxton Bragg as commander of the Confederate Army of Tennessee.
1864 – American Civil War: Battle of Nashville: The Union's Army of the Cumberland routs and destroys the Confederacy's Army of Tennessee, ending its effectiveness as a combat unit.
1880 – Outbreak of the First Boer War between the Boer South African Republic and the British Empire.
1882 – Wales and England contest the first Home Nations (now Six Nations) rugby union match.
1883 – Tonkin Campaign: French forces capture the Sơn Tây citadel.

1901–present
1905 – In Rugby Union, The "Match of the Century" is played between Wales and New Zealand at Cardiff Arms Park.
1912 – First Balkan War: The Royal Hellenic Navy defeats the Ottoman Navy at the Battle of Elli.
1914 – World War I: Admiral Franz von Hipper commands a raid on Scarborough, Hartlepool and Whitby.
1920 – The Haiyuan earthquake of 8.5, rocks the Gansu province in China, killing an estimated 200,000. 
1942 – The Holocaust: Schutzstaffel chief Heinrich Himmler orders that Roma candidates for extermination be deported to Auschwitz.
1944 – World War II: The Battle of the Bulge begins with the surprise offensive of three German armies through the Ardennes forest.
1960 – A United Airlines Douglas DC-8 and a TWA Lockheed Super Constellation collide over Staten Island, New York and crash, killing all 128 people aboard both aircraft and six more on the ground.
1968 – Second Vatican Council: Official revocation of the Edict of Expulsion of Jews from Spain.
1971 – Bangladesh Liberation War and Indo-Pakistani War of 1971: The ceasefire of the Pakistan Army brings an end to both conflicts. This is commemorated annually as Victory Day in Bangladesh, and as Vijay Diwas in India.
  1971   – The United Kingdom recognizes Bahrain's independence, which is commemorated annually as Bahrain's National Day.
1989 – Romanian Revolution: Protests break out in Timișoara, Romania, in response to an attempt by the government to evict dissident Hungarian pastor László Tőkés.
2013 – A bus falls from an elevated highway in the Philippines capital Manila killing at least 18 people with 20 injured.
2014 – Tehrik-i-Taliban Pakistan militants attack an Army Public School in Peshawar, Pakistan, killing 150 people, 132 of them schoolchildren.
2022 – A landslide occurs at a camp at an organic farm near the town of Batang Kali in Selangor, Malaysia, trapping 92 people and killing 31.

Births

Pre-1600
1364 – Emperor Manuel III of Trebizond (d. 1417)
1485 – Catherine of Aragon, Spanish princess, later queen consort of England (d. 1536)
1534 – Hans Bol, Flemish artist (d. 1593)
1582 – Robert Bertie, 1st Earl of Lindsey (d. 1642)
1584 – John Selden, English jurist and scholar (d. 1654)
1585 – Livia della Rovere, Italian noble (d. 1641)

1601–1900
1605 – Jerome Weston, 2nd Earl of Portland, English diplomat (d. 1663)
1614 – Eberhard III, Duke of Württemberg (d. 1674)
1630 – Mary Somerset, Duchess of Beaufort, British botanist (d. 1715)
1714 – George Whitefield, English Anglican priest (d. 1770)
1716 – Louis Jules Mancini Mazarini, French poet and diplomat (d. 1798)
1717 – Elizabeth Carter, English poet and scholar (d. 1806)
1730 – Diego Silang, Filipino revolutionary leader (d. 1763)
1742 – Gebhard Leberecht von Blücher, German field marshal (d. 1819)
1770 – Ludwig van Beethoven, composer (d. 1827)
1775 – Jane Austen, English novelist (d. 1817)
  1775   – François-Adrien Boieldieu, French pianist and composer (d. 1834)
1776 – Johann Wilhelm Ritter, German chemist, physicist, and philosopher (d. 1810)
1778 – John Ordronaux, French-American soldier (d. 1841)
1787 – Mary Russell Mitford, English author and playwright (d. 1855)
1790 – Leopold I of Belgium (d. 1865)
1804 – Viktor Bunyakovsky, Russian mathematician and academic (d. 1889)
1812 – Stuart Donaldson, English-Australian politician, 1st Premier of New South Wales (d. 1867)
1834 – Léon Walras, French-Swiss economist and theorist (d. 1910)
1836 – Ernst von Bergmann, Latvian-German surgeon and academic (d. 1907)
1849 – Mary Hartwell Catherwood, American author and poet (d. 1902)
1861 – Antonio de La Gándara, French painter and illustrator (d. 1917)
1863 – George Santayana, Spanish philosopher, novelist, and poet (d. 1952)
1865 – Olavo Bilac, Brazilian journalist and poet (d. 1918)
1866 – Wassily Kandinsky, Russian-French painter and theorist (d. 1944)
1867 – Amy Carmichael, Irish missionary and humanitarian (d. 1951)
1869 – Hristo Tatarchev, Bulgarian physician and activist, co-founded the Internal Macedonian Revolutionary Organization (d. 1952)
  1869   – Bertha Lamme Feicht, American electrical engineer (d. 1943)
1872 – Anton Denikin, Russian general (d. 1947)
1882 – Jack Hobbs, English cricketer and journalist (d. 1963)
  1882   – Zoltán Kodály, Hungarian composer, conductor, and musicologist (d. 1967)
  1882   – Walther Meissner, German physicist and engineer (d. 1974)
1883 – Károly Kós, Hungarian-Romanian architect, ethnologist, and politician (d. 1977)
  1883   – Max Linder, French actor, director, producer, and screenwriter (d. 1925)
1884 – John Gunn, Australian politician, 29th Premier of South Australia (d. 1959)
  1884   – Seibo Kitamura, Japanese sculptor (d. 1987)
1888 – Alexander I of Yugoslavia (d. 1934)
  1888   – Alphonse Juin, Algerian-French general (d. 1967)
1889 – Kim Chwa-chin, South Korean guerrilla leader (d. 1930)
1895 – Marie Hall Ets, American author and illustrator (d. 1984)
1896 – Anna Anderson, an imposter who claimed to be Grand Duchess Anastasia of Russia (d. 1984)
1899 – Noël Coward, English actor, playwright, and composer (d. 1973)
1900 – Lucille Lortel, American actress and producer (d. 1999)
  1900   – V. S. Pritchett, British writer and literary critic (d. 1997)

1901–present
1901 – Margaret Mead, American anthropologist and author (d. 1978)
1902 – Rafael Alberti, Spanish poet and playwright (d. 1999)
1903 – Hardie Albright, American actor (d. 1975)
  1903   – Harold Whitlock, English race walker and coach (d. 1985)
1905 – Piet Hein, Danish mathematician, author, and poet (d. 1996)
  1905   – Ruben Nirvi, Finnish linguist and professor (d. 1986)
1907 – Barbara Kent, Canadian-born American film actress (d. 2011)
1908 – Remedios Varo, Spanish-Mexican surrealist painter & anarchist (d. 1963)
1910 – Freddie Brown, Peruvian-English cricketer and sportscaster (d. 1991)
1913 – George Ignatieff, Russian-Canadian scholar and diplomat, 8th Canadian Ambassador to the United Nations (d. 1989)
1914 – O. Winston Link, American photographer (d. 2001)
1916 – Ruth Johnson Colvin, American author and educator, founded ProLiteracy Worldwide
1917 – Nabi Bux Khan Baloch, Pakistani author and scholar (d. 2011)
  1917   – Pete T. Cenarrusa, American soldier, pilot, and politician, Secretary of State of Idaho (d. 2013)
  1917   – Arthur C. Clarke, British science fiction writer (d. 2008)
1920 – Frederick Rotimi Williams, Nigerian lawyer and politician (d. 2005)
1921 – Eulalio González, Mexican singer-songwriter, director, producer, and screenwriter (d. 2003)
1922 – Cy Leslie, American record producer, founded Pickwick Records (d. 2008)
1923 – Menahem Pressler, German-American pianist
  1923   – Ernst Florian Winter, Austrian-American historian and political scientist (d. 2014)
1924 – Nicolas Sidjakov, Latvian-American illustrator (d. 1993)
1926 – James McCracken, American tenor and actor (d. 1988)
  1926   – A. N. R. Robinson, Tobagonian lawyer and politician, 3rd President of Trinidad and Tobago (d. 2014)
  1926   – Jeffrey Stone, American actor and screenwriter (d. 2012)
1927 – Peter Dickinson, Rhodesian-English author and poet (d. 2015)
  1927   – Randall Garrett, American author and poet (d. 1987)
1928 – Terry Carter, American actor, director, and producer
  1928   – Philip K. Dick, American philosopher and author (d. 1982)
1929 – Nicholas Courtney, Egyptian-English actor (d. 2011)
1930 – Bill Brittain, American author (d. 2011)
  1930   – Sam Most, American flute player and saxophonist (d. 2013)
  1930   – Bill Young, American sergeant and politician (d. 2013)
1932 – Quentin Blake, English author and illustrator
  1932   – Grace Alele-Williams, Nigerian mathematician and academic
  1932   – Lin Zhao, Chinese dissident and Christian executed during the Cultural Revolution (d. 1968)
1936 – Morris Dees, American lawyer and activist, co-founded the Southern Poverty Law Center
1937 – Joyce Bulifant, American actress 
  1937   – Edward Ruscha, American painter and photographer
1938 – Frank Deford, American journalist and author (d. 2017)
  1938   – Liv Ullmann, Norwegian actress, director, and screenwriter
1939 – Philip Langridge, English tenor (d. 2010)
  1939   – Gordon Miller, English high jumper
1941 – Lesley Stahl, American journalist and actress
  1941   – Roger Neil Wheeler, English general
1942 – Donald Carcieri, American educator and politician, 73rd Governor of Rhode Island
1943 – Steven Bochco, American television writer and producer (d. 2018)
  1943   – Patti Deutsch, American actress and comedian (d. 2017)
1944 – Jeff Kanew, American director and screenwriter
  1944   – Don Meyer, American basketball player and coach (d. 2014)
1945 – Tony Hicks, English singer and guitarist 
1946 – Benny Andersson, Swedish singer-songwriter, pianist, and producer 
  1946   – Charles Dennis, Canadian actor, director, producer, and screenwriter 
  1946   – Trevor Pinnock, English harpsichord player and conductor
  1946   – Tom Stern, American cinematographer
1947 – Ben Cross, English actor (d. 2020)
  1947   – Vincent Matthews, American sprinter
  1947   – Martyn Poliakoff, English chemist and academic
  1947   – Trevor Żahra, Maltese novelist, poet and illustrator
1949 – Billy Gibbons, American singer-songwriter, guitarist, and producer
  1949   – Heather Hallett, English lawyer and judge
1950 – Claudia Cohen, American journalist (d. 2007)
  1950   – Roy Schuiten, Dutch cyclist and manager (d. 2006)
1951 – Sally Emerson, English author and poet
  1951   – Mike Flanagan, American baseball player, coach, and sportscaster (d. 2011)
  1951   – Robben Ford, American guitarist and songwriter 
  1951   – Mark Heard, American singer-songwriter, guitarist, and producer (d. 1992)
  1951   – Aykut Barka, Turkish scientist (d. 2002)
1952 – Joel Garner, Barbadian cricketer and manager
  1952   – Francesco Graziani, Italian footballer and manager
1953 – Rebecca Forstadt, American voice actress and screenwriter
1955 – Xander Berkeley, American actor and producer
  1955   – Carol Browner, American lawyer and environmentalist, 8th Administrator of the Environmental Protection Agency
  1955   – Prince Lorenz of Belgium, Archduke of Austria-Este
  1955   – Chiharu Matsuyama, Japanese singer-songwriter
1956 – Lizzy Mercier Descloux, French musician, singer-songwriter, composer, actress, writer and painter (d. 2004)
1957 – Antonio Vega, Spanish singer-songwriter and guitarist (d. 2009)
1958 – Bart Oates, American football player and lawyer
1959 – H. D. Kumaraswamy, Indian social worker and politician, 18th Chief Minister of Karnataka
  1959   – Alexander Lebedev, Russian businessman and politician
  1959   – Steve Mattsson, American author and illustrator
1960 – Pat Van Den Hauwe, Belgian footballer and manager
1961 – André Andersen, Russian-Danish keyboard player, songwriter, and producer 
  1961   – Shane Black, American actor, director, and screenwriter
  1961   – Bill Hicks, American comedian and musician (d. 1994)
  1961   – LaChanze, American actress, singer, and dancer
  1961   – Jon Tenney, American actor and director
1962 – Maruschka Detmers, Dutch-French actress
  1962   – William Perry, American football player and wrestler
1963 – Benjamin Bratt, American actor and producer
  1963   – Cathy Johnston-Forbes, American golfer
  1963   – James Mangold, American director, producer, and screenwriter
1964 – Heike Drechsler, German sprinter and long jumper
  1964   – John Kirwan, New Zealand rugby player and coach
  1964   – Georgie Parker, Australian actress
  1964   – Billy Ripken, American baseball player and sportscaster
  1964   – Todd Glass, American comedian
1965 – Chris Jones, American baseball player and manager
  1965   – Melanie Sloan, American lawyer and activist
1966 – Paul McGinley, Irish golfer
  1966   – Clifford Robinson, American basketball player (d. 2020)
  1966   – Dennis Wise, English footballer and manager
1967 – Donovan Bailey, Canadian sprinter and sportscaster
  1967   – Indrek Kaseorg, Estonian decathlete
  1967   – Miranda Otto, Australian actress 
1968 – Wendy Doolan, Australian golfer
  1968   – Lalah Hathaway, American singer-songwriter, pianist, and producer
  1968   – Greg Kovacs, Canadian bodybuilder (d. 2013)
1969 – Simon Grayson, English footballer and manager
  1969   – Adam Riess, American astrophysicist, astronomer, and academic Nobel Prize laureate
  1969   – Michelle Smith, Irish swimmer
  1969   – Dmitri Tymoczko, American composer and theorist
  1969   – Craig White, English cricketer and coach
  1969   – Kent Hehr, Canadian politician
1970 – Valerie Chow, Canadian-Hong Kong actress and publicist
1971 – Seyhan Kurt, French-Turkish poet and sociologist
  1971   – Michael McCary, American R&B singer
1972 – Charles Gipson, American baseball player
  1972   – Paul Leyden, Australian actor, director, producer, and screenwriter
  1972   – Travis Morrison, American singer-songwriter 
1973 – Themba Mnguni, South African footballer
  1973   – Scott Storch, American songwriter and producer, founded Storch Music Company
1975 – Valentin Bădoi, Romanian footballer and manager
  1975   – Kaba Diawara, French-Guinean footballer
  1975   – Benjamin Kowalewicz, Canadian singer-songwriter and guitarist 
  1975   – Paul Maynard, English politician
1976 – Jen Golbeck, American computer scientist and academic
1977 – Éric Bélanger, Canadian ice hockey player
  1977   – Sylvain Distin, French footballer
1978 – John Morris, Canadian curler and firefighter
  1978   – Gunter Van Handenhoven, Belgian footballer and manager
1979 – Trevor Immelman, South African golfer
  1979   – Daniel Narcisse, French handball player
  1979   – Mihai Trăistariu, Romanian singer-songwriter
  1979   – Jessie Ward, American wrestler and producer
1980 – Danish Kaneria, Pakistani cricketer
1981 – Krysten Ritter, American actress, musician, and model
  1981   – Reanna Solomon, Nauruan weightlifter (d. 2022)
  1981   – Gareth Williams, Scottish footballer
1982 – Antrel Rolle, American football player
  1982   – Anna Sedokova, Ukrainian singer, actress and television presenter
  1982   – Stanislav Šesták, Slovak footballer
1983 – Kelenna Azubuike, American basketball player
  1983   – Frankie Ballard, American singer-songwriter and guitarist
1984 – Theo James, English actor 
1985 – Stanislav Manolev, Bulgarian footballer
  1985   – James Nash, English race car driver
1986 – Alcides Escobar, Venezuelan baseball player
  1986   – Zoltán Kovács, Hungarian footballer (d. 2013)
  1986   – Pärt Uusberg, Estonian actor, composer, and conductor.
1987 – Mame Biram Diouf, Senegalese footballer
  1987   – Beau Dowler, Australian footballer
  1987   – Hallee Hirsh, American actress
1988 – Mats Hummels, German footballer
1990 – Rebecca Marino, Canadian tennis player
1991 – Craig Goodwin, Australian footballer 
1992 – Ulrikke Eikeri, Norwegian tennis player
  1992   – Anamul Haque, Bangladeshi cricketer
  1992   – Pietro Perdichizzi, Belgian footballer
  1992   – Tom Rogic, Australian footballer
1994 – Elliot Lee, English footballer
  1994   – Nicola Murru, Italian footballer
  1994   – José Rodríguez Martínez, Spanish footballer
1998 – Mira Antonitsch, Austrian tennis player

Deaths

Pre-1600
 604 – Houzhu, emperor of the Chen dynasty (b. 553)
 705 – Wu Zetian, Empress of the Zhou dynasty (b. 624)
 714 – Pepin of Herstal, Frankish statesman (b. 635)
 867 – Eberhard of Friuli, Frankish duke (b. 815)
 874 – Ado, archbishop of Vienne 
 882 – John VIII, pope of the Catholic Church
 902 – Wei Yifan, chancellor of the Tang dynasty
999 – Adelaide of Italy, Holy Roman Empress (b. 931)
1153 – Ranulf de Gernon, 4th Earl of Chester, Norman nobleman
1263 – Haakon IV, king of Norway (b. 1204)
1316 – Öljaitü, Mongolian ruler (b. 1280)
1325 – Charles, French nobleman (b. 1270)
1378 – Secondotto, marquess of Montferrat (b. 1360)
1379 – John FitzAlan, 1st Baron Arundel, English general and politician, Lord Marshall of England (b. 1348)
1470 – John II, duke of Lorraine (b. 1424)
1474 – Ali Qushji, Uzbek astronomer, mathematician, and physicist (b. 1403)
1515 – Afonso de Albuquerque, Portuguese admiral and politician, 3rd Viceroy of Portuguese India (b. 1453)
1558 – Thomas Cheney, English diplomat and Lord Warden of the Cinque Ports
1583 – Ivan Fyodorov, Russian printer
1594 – Allison Balfour, Scottish witch 
1598 – Yi Sun-sin, Korean general (b. 1545)

1601–1900
1669 – Nathaniel Fiennes, English soldier and politician (b. 1608)
1687 – William Petty, English economist and philosopher (b. 1623)
1751 – Leopold II, Prince of Anhalt-Dessau (b. 1700)
1774 – François Quesnay, French economist, physician, and philosopher (b. 1694)
1783 – Johann Adolph Hasse, German composer and educator (b. 1699)
  1783   – Sir William James, 1st Baronet, Welsh-English commander and politician (b. 1720)
1805 – Saverio Cassar, Gozitan priest and rebel leader (b. 1746)
1809 – Antoine François, comte de Fourcroy, French chemist and entomologist (b. 1755)
1859 – Wilhelm Grimm, German anthropologist and author (b. 1786)
1892 – Henry Yesler, American businessman and politician, 7th Mayor of Seattle (b. 1810)
1897 – Alphonse Daudet, French author, poet, and playwright (b. 1840)
1898 – Pavel Tretyakov, Russian businessman and art collector (b. 1832)

1901–present
1908 – American Horse, American tribal leader and educator (b. 1840)
1917 – Frank Gotch, American wrestler (b. 1878)
1921 – Camille Saint-Saëns, French pianist, composer, and conductor (b. 1835)
1922 – Gabriel Narutowicz, Lithuanian–Polish engineer and politician, 1st President of the Republic of Poland (b. 1865)
1928 – Elinor Wylie, American poet and author (b. 1885)
1935 – Thelma Todd, American actress and comedian (b. 1905)
1936 – Frank Eugene, American-German photographer and educator (b. 1865)
1940 – Eugène Dubois, Dutch paleoanthropologist (b. 1858)
  1940   – Billy Hamilton, American baseball player and manager (b. 1866)
1943 – George Bambridge, English diplomat (b. 1892)
1944 – Betsie ten Boom, Dutch Holocaust victim (b. 1885)
1945 – Giovanni Agnelli, Italian businessman, founded Fiat (b. 1866)
  1945   – Fumimaro Konoe, Japanese lawyer and politician, 23rd Prime Minister of Japan (b. 1891)
1949 – Sidney Olcott, Canadian-American actor, director, producer, and screenwriter (b. 1873)
1952 – Robert Henry Best, American journalist (b. 1896)
1956 – Nina Hamnett, Welsh painter and author (b. 1890)
1961 – Hans Rebane, Estonian journalist and politician, 8th Minister of Foreign Affairs (b. 1882)
1965 – W. Somerset Maugham, British playwright, novelist, and short story writer (b. 1874)
1968 – Futabayama Sadaji, Japanese sumo wrestler, the 35th Yokozuna (b. 1912)
  1968   – Muhammad Suheimat, Jordanian general and politician (b. 1916)
1969 – Alphonse Castex, French rugby union player (b. 1899)
  1969   – Soe Hok Gie, Indonesian activist and academic (b. 1942)
1970 – Oscar Lewis, American anthropologist of Latin America (b. 1914)
1974 – Kostas Varnalis, Greek poet and playwright (b. 1884)
1976 – Réal Caouette, Canadian journalist and politician (b. 1917)
1977 – Risto Jarva, Finnish director, producer, and screenwriter (b. 1934)
1980 – Colonel Sanders, American businessman, founded KFC (b. 1890)
  1980   – Hellmuth Walter, German-American engineer (b. 1900)
1982 – Colin Chapman, English engineer and businessman, founded Lotus Cars (b. 1928)
1983 – Debs Garms, American baseball player (b. 1907)
1984 – Karl Deichgräber, German philologist and academic (b. 1903)
1985 – Thomas Bilotti, American mobster (b. 1940)
  1985   – Paul Castellano, American mobster (b. 1915)
1989 – Oscar Alfredo Gálvez, Argentinian race car driver (b. 1913)
  1989   – Silvana Mangano, Italian actress (b. 1930)
  1989   – Aileen Pringle, American actress (b. 1895)
  1989   – Lee Van Cleef, American actor (b. 1925)
1991 – Eszter Tamási, Hungarian actress and journalist (b. 1938)
1993 – Moses Gunn, American actor (b. 1929)
  1993   – Kakuei Tanaka, Japanese soldier and politician, 64th Prime Minister of Japan (b. 1918)
1996 – Quentin Bell, English historian and author (b. 1910)
1997 – Lillian Disney, American illustrator and philanthropist (b. 1899)
1998 – William Gaddis, American author and academic (b. 1922)
2001 – Stuart Adamson, English-Scottish singer-songwriter and guitarist (b. 1958)
  2001   – Stefan Heym, German-American soldier and author (b. 1913)
2003 – Robert Stanfield, Canadian economist, lawyer, and politician, 17th Premier of Nova Scotia (b. 1914)
  2003   – Gary Stewart, American singer-songwriter (b. 1945)
2004 – Ted Abernathy, American baseball player (b. 1933)
  2004   – Deyda Hydara, Gambian journalist, co-founded The Point (b. 1946)
  2004   – Agnes Martin, American painter and educator (b. 1912)
2005 – Kenneth Bulmer, English author (b. 1921)
  2005   – Ed Hansen, American director and screenwriter (b. 1937)
  2005   – John Spencer, American actor (b. 1946)
2006 – Don Jardine, Canadian wrestler and trainer (b. 1940)
  2006   – Taliep Petersen, South African singer-songwriter and director (b. 1950)
  2006   – Pnina Salzman, Israeli pianist and educator (b. 1922)
  2006   – Stanford J. Shaw, American historian and academic (b. 1930)
2007 – Dan Fogelberg, American singer-songwriter and guitarist (b. 1951)
2009 – Roy E. Disney, American businessman (b. 1930)
  2009   – Yegor Gaidar, Russian economist and politician, Prime Minister of Russia (b. 1956)
  2009   – Manto Tshabalala-Msimang, South African physician and politician, 22nd South African Minister of Health (b. 1940)
2010 – Melvin E. Biddle, American soldier, Medal of Honor recipient (b. 1923)
  2010   – Ayinde Barrister, Nigerian fuji musician (b. 1948)
2011 – Robert Easton, American actor and screenwriter (b. 1930)
  2011   – Nicol Williamson, Scottish actor (b. 1938)
2012 – Elwood V. Jensen, American biologist and academic (b. 1920)
  2012   – Jake Adam York, American poet and academic (b. 1972)
2013 – James Flint, English commander (b. 1913)
  2013   – Ray Price, American singer-songwriter and guitarist (b. 1926)
  2013   – Marta Russell, American journalist, author, and activist (b. 1951)
2014 – Martin Brasier, English paleontologist, biologist, and academic (b. 1947)
  2014   – Tim Cochran, American mathematician and academic (b. 1955)
2015 – Peter Dickinson, Rhodesian-English author and poet (b. 1927)
  2015   – Lizmark, Mexican wrestler (b. 1950)
  2015   – George Earl Ortman, American painter and sculptor (b. 1926)
2017 – Keely Smith, American singer and actress (b. 1928)

Holidays and observances
Christian feast day:
Adelaide of Italy
Haggai
Ralph Adams Cram, Richard Upjohn and John La Farge (Episcopal Church (USA))
December 16 (Eastern Orthodox liturgics)
Day of Reconciliation, formerly celebrated as Day of the Vow by the Afrikaners (South Africa)
National Day, celebrates the withdrawal of United Kingdom from Bahrain, making Bahrain an independent emirate in 1971.
National Sports Day (Thailand)
The beginning of the nine-day celebration beginning December 16 and ending December 24, celebrating the trials which Mary and Joseph endured before finding a place to stay where Jesus could be born (Hispanidad):
The first day of Las Posadas (Mexico, Latin America)
The first day of the Simbang Gabi novena of masses (Philippines)
Victory Day (Bangladesh) and Victory Day (India)

References

External links

 BBC: On This Day
 
 Historical Events on December 16

Days of the year
December